Rolandas Maščinskas (born 6 August 1992) is a Lithuanian rower. At the 2010 Summer Youth Olympics he won the gold medal in the single sculls event. Maščinskas become the first Lithuanian champion and the first medalist in the Youth Olympics.

Biography
Currently living in Trakai. Studying in Mykolas Romeris University.

Achievements

References

Lithuanian male rowers
1992 births
Living people
Sportspeople from Trakai
Rowers at the 2010 Summer Youth Olympics
Rowers at the 2012 Summer Olympics
Olympic rowers of Lithuania
Lithuanian Sportsperson of the Year winners
World Rowing Championships medalists for Lithuania
Youth Olympic gold medalists for Lithuania
Mykolas Romeris University alumni